André Verbart (born 23 January 1960) is a Dutch poet.

Early life 

Verbart was born in 1960 in 's-Heerenhoek. In 1995, he was promoted to doctor for his study of the epic poem Paradise Lost by the 17th-century English poet John Milton. The results of his study were published as Fellowship in Paradise Lost.

Career 

Verbart made his debut as poet with poetry collection 98 in 1999. In 2000 he won the C. Buddingh'-prijs for this debut.

Awards 
 2000: C. Buddingh'-prijs

Publications 

 Fellowship in Paradise Lost (1995)
 98 (1999)

References 

1960 births
Living people
Dutch male poets
C. Buddingh' Prize winners